Mohammad Fashah Iskandar bin S Rosedin is a Singaporean professional footballer who plays as a goalkeeper for Singapore Premier League club Tanjong Pagar United.

Club career

Young Lions
He started his footballing career in 2013 where he signed for Young Lions.

Tampines Rovers
In 2016, he signed for Tampines Rovers.

Young Lions
He returned to Young Lions in 2016 and made his first competitive debut there after their French keeper left. 

Despite criticism on his weight, Iskandar responded to it by saying “It is not about the body size but performance on the pitch”.

Career statistics

. Caps and goals may not be correct

International career
He has been involved in many of the Singaporean national youth teams. He was first called up to the Singapore U22 in 2017 for the match against Vanuatu U20.

References

1995 births
Living people
Singaporean footballers
Association football goalkeepers
Tanjong Pagar United FC players
Warriors FC players
Young Lions FC players